Cotley Castle is a large Iron Age Hill fort near Dunchideock in Devon and close to Exeter in England.

References

Hill forts in Devon